The Heirs, also known as The Inheritors, is a South Korean television series starring Lee Min-ho, Park Shin-hye, and Kim Woo-bin. Written by Kim Eun-sook, the drama is set in a high school populated by the privileged and uber-rich. It aired on SBS from October 9 to December 12, 2013.

This was the first Korean drama co-produced by American digital distribution platform DramaFever and Korean production company Hwa&Dam Pictures.

Due to its star-studded cast and writer Kim Eun-sook (who previously wrote Lovers in Paris, Secret Garden and A Gentleman's Dignity), international broadcasting rights were sold to 13 countries. It had the highest selling price in Japan among all the 2013 Korean dramas at US$30,000 for each episode. As of January 26, 2014, the series has garnered more than one billion views on Youku, China's biggest video streaming site.

Synopsis
The series follows a group of wealthy, privileged high school students as they are about to take over their families' business empires, overcoming difficulties and growing every step of the way.

Kim Tan (Lee Min-ho) is a wealthy heir to a large Korean conglomerate called Jeguk Group. He was exiled to the U.S. by his half-brother Kim Won (Choi Jin-hyuk), who tries to take control of the family business. While in the States, he meets Cha Eun-sang (Park Shin-hye), who went there to look for her sister. Despite being engaged to Yoo Rachel (Kim Ji-won), a fellow heiress, Kim Tan soon falls in love with Eun-sang. When Kim Tan returns to Korea, his former best friend turned enemy Choi Young-do (Kim Woo-bin) begins picking on Eun-sang to irritate Tan. Tension ensues when Young-do also falls in love with Eun-sang, and Kim Tan is forced to choose between his responsibility of pursuing the family business or love.

Cast

Main
Lee Min-ho as Kim Tan
Jung Chan-woo as young Kim Tan
Jeon Jin-seo as child Kim Tan
Heir to Jeguk Group. He is the son of his father's mistress, but is listed in the family registry as the son of the second wife in order to be a legitimate child. Though hot-headed and at times immature, Kim Tan is warm-hearted and honest. Although he is engaged to Yoo Rachel, he is attracted to Cha Eun-sang at first sight and falls in love with her despite her poor background.
Park Shin-hye as Cha Eun-sang
Down-to-earth and somewhat cynical, Eun-sang diligently works part-time jobs to support herself and her mother after her sister leaves for the U.S. She lives in Kim Tan's home, since her mother is a live-in housekeeper of Tan's family. She is enrolled in Jeguk High School on a welfare scholarship given by Chairman Kim.
Kim Woo-bin as Choi Young-do
Yang Hyun-mo as young Choi Young-do
The heir to the Zeus Hotel Group. Known for his cunning intellect and volatile manners, he is feared by his classmates, whom he bullies. He is formerly best friends with Kim Tan, but a misunderstanding made them enemies. Young-do begins picking on Cha Eun-sang to irritate Tan but he soon realizes that's not the only reason she's always on his mind.

Supporting

Jeguk High School
Kim Ji-won as Yoo Rachel
 Kim Tan's fiancée. The rich, chic and haughty heiress of clothing company RS International, she is also known as the "Paris Hilton of Jeguk High School". She dislikes Cha Eun-sang, and attempts many times to split her and Kim Tan apart. She is also on close terms with Tan's half-brother, Kim Won.
Kang Min-hyuk as Yoon Chan-young
Son of Jeguk Group's secretary. Kind, cool-headed, warm, and smart, Chan-young always sees the best in people. Despite being in the social care group, he doesn't get picked on by the "higher social status" students because he is the class president. He is also Eun-sang's best friend, and his friendship with her makes his girlfriend, Lee Bo-na jealous. Nonetheless, Chan-young thinks that everything Bo-na does is cute, especially when she is jealous.
Kang Ha-neul as Lee Hyo-shin
Son of the attorney general. Calm and laid back, he runs the school broadcasting system together with Bo-na and later Eun-sang. He is also close friends with Kim Tan. Hyo-shin is constantly pressured by his family to get into law school, despite his dislike for the profession. To overcome his family's pressure, he joins the army without telling anyone besides Tan and Rachel. Hyo-shin also has a one-sided crush on his private tutor, Jeon Hyun-joo, but later falls for Rachel.
Krystal Jung as Lee Bo-na
The beautiful daughter of the CEO of Mega Entertainment. Though somewhat spoiled, she is actually kind-hearted. She is praised for her beauty and cuteness. She is Kim Tan's first love and ex-girlfriend, and now they are still on friendly terms. She is now dating Chan-young. She dislikes Eun-sang at first for being Chan-young's best friend, believing that "there is no way for a girl and a boy to simply be just friends", but as the time goes by she became friends with her. She has a protective older brother she is close to who studies in New York.
Park Hyung-sik as Jo Myung-soo
Son of the CEO of Victory Law Firm, the largest law firm in the country. He is quick-witted, playful and often jokes around. He often hangs out at night clubs and take photos of his friends. He is best friends with Young-do and Bo-na.
Jeon Soo-jin as Kang Ye-sol
The daughter of a former bar hostess who owns 10 large bars in Gangnam. She is Lee Bo-na's best friend. Her existence in Jeguk High School was unremarkable until Rachel exposed her mother's profession, which temporarily halted her friendship with Bo-na as she had looked down on Eun-Sang for her humble upbringing despite her own mother's past profession as a bar hostess. She has a crush on Choi Young-do.
Choi Tae-hwan as Lee Sang-woo
Choi Young-do's lackey.
Yang Seung-pil as Hyo-joon
Choi Young-do's lackey.
Cho Yoon-woo as Moon Joon-young
A victim of Choi Young-do's bullying at Jeguk High School due to his "welfare status". He later leaves the school.

Jeguk high school staff
Lim Ju-eun as Jeon Hyun-joo
A teacher at Jeguk High School. Diligent and earnest, Hyun-joo gets Kim Won's attention for her sharp intelligence, and they enter into a relationship. But she eventually broke up with Won to allow him to concentrate on running the company. She is also the private tutor of Hyo-shin, who had a crush on her.

Kim Tan's family
Choi Jin-hyuk as Kim Won
Kim Tan's older half-brother. The son of his father's first wife, who died when he was young. He is an accomplished and capable young executive who runs his family's giant conglomerate. At constant friction with his family, he attempts to rule the company himself, and fears that Tan will get in his way. Due to this, he had never had a real brotherly relationship with Tan, despite the latter trying everything he can to win his brother's heart. He is in a relationship with Hyun-joo, whom he later gives up on for the sake of the company.
Kim Sung-ryung as Han Ki-ae
Kim Tan's mother and the mistress of Kim Nam-yoon. Though somewhat vain and self-centered, she cares for her son deeply and only wants him to be happy. She later forms a friendship with Eun-Sang's mother.
Jung Dong-hwan as Kim Nam-yoon
President of Jeguk Group, and father of Kim Tan and Kim Won.
Park Joon-geum as Jung Ji-suk
Chairwoman of Jeguk High School. Kim Nam-yoon's second wife, and Kim Tan's legal mother. Selfish and controlling, she attempts to take over Jeguk Group when her husband falls ill.

Cha Eun-sang's family
Kim Mi-kyung as Park Hee-nam
The mute housekeeper of Tan's family, and mother of Eun-sang. She lost her voice when she was three years old due to a severe fever. She often gives advice to Kim Tan's mother. She is kind, and wants the best for her daughter.

Yoo Rachel's family
Yoon Son-ha as Esther Lee
President of RS International and Rachel's mother, who is engaged to Choi Dong-uk, Young-do's father. However, she still appears to be in love with Yoon Jae-ho, whom she previously gave up on to marry someone who would help her business.

Choi Young-do's family
Choi Jin-ho as Choi Dong-wook
President of Zeus Hotel Group and father of Young-do. He is controlling and violent, and became a womanizer after his first wife, Young-do's mother, left their family. He is engaged to Esther Lee, but he's having an affair.

Yoon Chan-young's family
Choi Won-young as Yoon Jae-ho
Jeguk Group's secretary and Chan-young's father, who was previously involved with Esther Lee. He is Kim Won's confidant.

Others
Baek Seung-hyeon as Secretary Jung 
Choi Ji-na as Yoo Kyung-ran
Choi Young-do's mother.
Seo Yi-sook as Lee Hyo-shin's mother 
Jung Won-joong as Lee Chan-hyuk
Lee Hyo-shin's father.
Lee Yeon-kyung as Lee Bo-na's mother 
Ra Mi-ran as Jo Myung-soo's mother 
Choi Eun-kyung as Kang Ye-sol's mother
Hwang Young-hee as Jeguk High School teacher
Lee Joon-woo as student
Lee Ga-ryeong as clothing store employee
Jung Da-eun as herself

Special appearances
 Yoon Jin-seo as Cha Eun-suk / Stella Cha (ep. 1)
Cha Eun-sang's sister.
 Kim Hee-chul as music program MC (ep. 4)
 2Eyes as themselves (ep. 4)
 VIXX as themselves (ep. 4)
 BtoB as themselves (ep. 4)
 Jung Joo-hee as announcer (ep. 15–16)
 Wang Ji-won as Yang Da-kyung (ep. 17, 19–20)
Kim Won's blind date woman.
 Lee Hyun-jin as Lee Hyun-jin (ep. 19)

Original soundtrack

Ratings
In this table,  represent the lowest ratings and  represent the highest ratings.

Awards and nominations

Remake
A 2014 Chinese television drama titled Billion Dollar Heir (亿万继承人) starring Yu Xiao Tong, Kan Qing Zi and Korean singer-actor Choi Si-won was originally reported to be a remake of The Heirs, but this was later denied by Choi and director Li Shao Hong, citing the completely different story and characters. In 2016, it was announced that a Korea-Chinese film based on The Heirs is in the works.

References

External links
  
 
 

Korean-language television shows
2013 South Korean television series debuts
2013 South Korean television series endings
1993 South Korean television series endings
2010s South Korean television series
Seoul Broadcasting System television dramas
Television shows set in South Korea
Television shows set in Seoul
Television series produced in Seoul
Television shows filmed in South Korea
Television shows written by Kim Eun-sook
South Korean teen dramas
South Korean romance television series
South Korean high school television series
Television series about teenagers
Television series by Hwa&Dam Pictures
South Korean drama television series